"Bring Me a Letter from My Old Home Town" is a World War I era ballad song released in 1918. A.G. Delamater wrote the lyrics and Will R. Anderson composed the music. It was written for both voice and piano.

The song was published by M. Witmark & Sons in New York City. On the sheet music cover is a group of "greater Vitagraph players" sitting around a table, writing letters. Behind them is a service flag with a red border and one blue star.

The song opens with a wounded soldier laying on a cot. He tells a nurse that the only thing that will cure his homesickness is hearing from his "old home town". The chorus is as follows:

Sheet music 
The sheet music can be found at Pritzker Military Museum & Library.

Performers 
The song was performed by Billy Jones for Edison Blue Amberol and by Will R. Anderson for Columbia.

References

Songs about letters (message)
Songs about cities
Songs of World War I
1918 songs